Joshua Sridhar (born 1974 in Chennai, India) is an Indian composer. He made his debut on the runaway hit Tamil film Kaadhal which was released on 8 December 2004.

Early life and education
Joshua Sridhar was born in Chennai on 9 March 1974 to Saravanan and Rajalakshmi. He studied at Bharatiya Vidya Bhavan's Rajaji Vidyashram in Chennai from 1980 to 1990. After finishing High School he studied Western Classical Music for two years. He studied 8 Grades (Trinity College, London) in both Theory of Music and Piano. In 1993 he converted to Christianity and was baptised at Emmanuel Methodist Church (Chennai) and was given the name Joshua, the biblical character from the old testament. Not wanting to remove the name he was given at the time of birth he kept the name Sridhar and came to be known as Joshua Sridhar. In 2004 he came out of Christianity and now lives as Hindu.

Career
Joshua Sridhar began his career in the year 1993 composing, arranging and programming music for gospel albums and jingles. In the year 1996, he entered Indian cinema. He worked as a keyboard player/programmer for many Indian film composers (notably Manisharma & A.R.Rahman) between 1996 and 2004. In 2004 made his film debut as composer of Kaadhal. The film was released on 8 December 2004.

Filmography

Notes:
 The films are listed in order that the music released, regardless of the dates the film released.
 The year next to the title of the affected films indicates the release year of the either dubbed or remade version in the named language later than the original version.
 • indicates original language release. Indicates simultaneous makes, if featuring in more languages.
 ♦ indicates a remade version, the remaining ones being dubbed versions.

References

External links
 

Tamil film score composers
Living people
1974 births
Musicians from Chennai